Theoson-Jordan Siebatcheu (born April 26, 1996), commonly known as Jordan Pefok, is an American professional soccer player who plays as a striker for Bundesliga club Union Berlin and the United States national team. He is a former youth international for France.

Club career

Reims
Pefok is a youth product of Stade de Reims, having joined the club as a 7-year-old. He made his Ligue 1 debut on January 31, 2015, against Toulouse, replacing Alexi Peuget after 67 minutes in a 1–0 away defeat. On August 9, 2015, Pefok scored his first Ligue 1 goal in only his second appearance, against Girondins de Bordeaux. He signed his first professional contract in September 2015 committing to a three-year deal with Reims.

On October 24, 2017, Pefok was named the Ligue 2 Player of the Month for September due to ranking among the league's best in both goals and assists, while leading Reims to the top of the Ligue 2 table. On December 16, 2017, he set a career high for goals in a match by netting a hat trick against Valenciennes. Pefok helped Reims win the 2017–18 Ligue 2 season and promotion to Ligue 1 for the 2018–19 season while also setting a record for the number of points in a Ligue 2 season. He finished the season with 17 goals, the second-highest total among all Ligue 2 players, as well as seven assists.

Rennes
On June 12, 2018, Pefok signed a contract with Ligue 1 side Rennes. On September 20, he made his European debut in the 2018–19 UEFA Europa League group stage for Rennes. On November 8, he scored his first European goal, against Dynamo Kyiv. On December 22, he had his first Ligue 1 brace, scoring two goals and adding an assist against Nîmes Olympique in a 4–0 victory.

Young Boys
On September 13, 2020, Pefok was loaned to Swiss side Young Boys. After recording 15 goals and four assists across all competitions during the loan, Young Boys exercised the option to make the move permanent, effective July 1, 2021.

On September 14, 2021, Pefok scored the winning goal in the opening match of the 2021–22 UEFA Champions League group stage. His winner for Young Boys came in the final minute of stoppage time for a 2–1 win against Manchester United.

Pefok earned the Swiss Super League scoring title for the 2021–22 season with 22 league goals, despite missing most of May 2022 due to injury. He became the first American to win the Golden Boot for a European league. Pefok recorded a career-best 27 goals and five assists across all competitions during the year including UEFA Champions League and its qualifiers.

Union Berlin 
On June 30, 2022, Pefok joined Union Berlin on a transfer from Young Boys. He scored on his debut for the club against Regionalliga Nordost club Chemnitzer FC in the first round of the DFB-Pokal on August 1, then scored again against city rivals Hertha in the league opener on August 6.

International career
Pefok was born in Washington, D.C. to Cameroonian parents and grew up in France. As a result, he was initially eligible to play for France, Cameroon, or the United States internationally.

Pefok was called up for the first time to the France under-21 national team for two friendly matches in June 2017. He scored against Albania under-21s in his debut, and also played against Cameroon under-20s.

The United States Soccer Federation inquired about Pefok, and he was invited to the United States camp for a match against France in June 2018 but declined the call-up, citing his transfer from Reims to Rennes, while leaving the door open for possible inclusion in the United States squad in the future. On March 10, 2021, he announced that he had committed to play for the United States.

Pefok made his debut for the United States on March 25, 2021, in a 4–1 friendly win over Jamaica. On June 3, 2021, he scored the winning goal in the 89th minute of a 1–0 win over Honduras in the CONCACAF Nations League semifinal, after entering the game as a late substitution.

Name
Jordan wears Pefok, his mother's maiden name, on the back of his jersey for the United States and did for BSC Young Boys, though he will wear "Jordan" for Union Berlin.  On the Squad page for Union Berlin, he is identified as Jordan Siebatcheu.

Career statistics

Club

International

Scores and results list the United States' goal tally first, score column indicates score after each Pefok goal.

Honors
Reims
Ligue 2: 2017–18

Rennes
Coupe de France: 2018–19

Young Boys
Swiss Super League: 2020–21

United States
CONCACAF Nations League: 2019–20

References

External links
 
 
 
 

1996 births
Living people
Soccer players from Washington, D.C.
United States men's international soccer players
American soccer players
French footballers
France under-21 international footballers
France youth international footballers
American emigrants to France
American people of Cameroonian descent
French sportspeople of Cameroonian descent
Association football forwards
Ligue 1 players
Ligue 2 players
Championnat National players
Championnat National 2 players
Championnat National 3 players
Swiss Super League players
Bundesliga players
Stade de Reims players
LB Châteauroux players
Stade Rennais F.C. players
BSC Young Boys players
1. FC Union Berlin players
American expatriate soccer players
French expatriate footballers
American expatriate sportspeople in Switzerland
French expatriate sportspeople in Switzerland
Expatriate footballers in Switzerland
American expatriate soccer players in Germany